Victor Irving Marino (October 2, 1918 – January 7, 2006), sometimes known as the "Little Dynamo", was an American football player who played at the guard position. He played college football for Ohio State from 1936 to 1939, service football for the undefeated 1942 Great Lakes Navy Bluejackets football team, and professional football for various clubs, including the 1947 Baltimore Colts. He was also injured while serving on the USS Maddox during the Allied invasion of Sicily.

Early years
Marino was born in Columbus, Ohio, in 1918. He attended Rayen High School in Youngstown, Ohio. He played college football for the Ohio State Buckeyes from 1936 to 1939. He helped lead the 1939 Ohio State Buckeyes football team to a Big Ten championship and was selected by the Big Ten coaches as a first-team guard on the Associated Press 1939 All-Big Ten Conference football team. He was also selected for the Midwest College All-Stars that played in a charity game against the Cleveland Rams.

Professional football and military service
In 1940, he played professional football for the Boston Bears of the American Football League. He appeared in 10 games at guard for Boston, all of them as a starter.

He enlisted in the United States Navy in July 1941, five months before the Japanese attack on Pearl Harbor. He was initially assigned as an athletic trainer at the Great Lakes Naval Training Station and played for the undefeated 1942 Great Lakes Navy Bluejackets football team that was ranked No. 1 in the final AP Service Poll. In July 1943, he was an anti-aircraft gunner on the destroyer USS Maddox during the Allied invasion of Sicily and ended up with eight pieces of shrapnel in his body and a head wound when the Maddox was attacked and sunk by Nazi bombers. After the injuries, Marino was assigned to the physical education department at Naval Station Treasure Island.

In the fall of 1945, he played for the Oakland Giants of the Pacific Coast Football League. After the 1945 season, he signed to play professional football for the Chicago Bears but did not play for the team. He instead played for the Akron Bears of the American Football League in 1946. He also played professional football in the All-America Football Conference (AAFC) for the Baltimore Colts during the 1947 season. He appeared in a total of 13 AAFC games, four as a starter.

Later years
Marino died in 2006 at age 87 at a nursing home in Worthington, Ohio. He was buried at the Kingwood Memorial Park in Lewis Center, Ohio.
He was born to the late Anthony and Teresa (Churches) Marino, in Columbus, Ohio on October 2, 1918, and raised in Youngstown, Ohio. Victor served in the U.S. Navy; received the Purple Heart and the Bronze Star and was a survivor aboard the USS Maddox, which was sunk during WW II. He attended The Ohio State University where he played as guard on the Ohio State Football Team from 1937-1939, lettering 3 years and was named to the 1939 All-American Team, graduating from OSU in 1940. He was a good friend of Woody Hayes and often would consult Woody during his coaching years. Post College he played for the Baltimore Colts and the Chicago Bears and was a Mid-Western Handball Champion. Vic also coached the Pope's Inn semi-pro football team, where George Steinbrenner was one of his assistant coaches.

References

1918 births
2006 deaths
Baltimore Colts (1947–1950) players
Ohio State Buckeyes football players
Players of American football from Columbus, Ohio